Bigwig may refer to:

Bigwig (band)
Bigwig (Watership Down), a character in the novel Watership Down
BIGWIG (library organization), an interest group of the Library Information and Technology Association, a division of the American Library Association
long wigs worn as court dress, on special ceremonial occasions